The 2021–22 Eredivisie was the 66th season of Eredivisie, the premier football competition in the Netherlands. It began on 14 August 2021 and concluded on 15 May 2022.

Teams
SC Cambuur (promoted after a five-year absence), Go Ahead Eagles and NEC Nijmegen (both promoted after a four-year absence) were promoted from the 2020–21 Eerste Divisie. ADO Den Haag (relegated after thirteen years in the top flight), VVV-Venlo (relegated after four years in the top flight) and FC Emmen (relegated after three years in the top flight) have been relegated to 2021–22 Eerste Divisie.

Stadiums and locations

Number of teams by province

Personnel and kits

Managerial changes

Standings

League table

Results

Fixtures and results

Results by round

European play-offs 
The European play-offs were contested by the four highest ranked teams which were not yet qualified for any European tournament. The matches were played on a home-and-away basis, from 18 to 29 May. The winner received a spot in the second qualifying round of the 2022–23 UEFA Europa Conference League.

Qualified teams

Bracket

Semi-finals

First legs

Second legs

Final

First leg

Second leg

Promotion/relegation play-offs 
The seeds were assigned based on the final ranking after the regular season. The best ranked team got the highest seed (lowest number). Eredivisie teams were considered to be better ranked than Eerste Divisie teams.

If a match was level at the end of normal playing time, extra time was played (two periods of fifteen minutes each) and followed, if necessary, by a penalty shoot-out to determine the winners.

Seven teams, six from the Eerste Divisie and one from the Eredivisie, played for a spot in the 2022–23 Eredivisie. The remaining six teams played in the 2022–23 Eerste Divisie. The highest seeded team or the team from the Eredivisie always host the second leg.

Qualified teams

Bracket

First round

First legs

Second legs

Semi-finals

First legs

Second legs

Final

First leg

Second leg

Statistics

Top scorers

Hat-tricks

Top assists

Clean sheets

Discipline

Player
 Most yellow cards: 10
  Matúš Bero (Vitesse)
  Adam Maher (FC Utrecht)
  Mark van der Maarel (FC Utrecht)
 Most red cards: 2
  Joris Kramer (Go Ahead Eagles)
  Mike te Wierik (FC Groningen)

Club
 Most yellow cards: 65
 Vitesse
 Most red cards: 6
 Vitesse
 Willem II

Awards

Monthly awards

Annual awards

References

External links

Eredivisie seasons
1
Netherlands